Anaitara Union is a union of Mirzapur Upazila, Tangail District, Bangladesh.

Demographics
According to the 2011 Bangladesh census, Anaitara Union had 5,657 households and a population of 24,912. The literacy rate (age 7 and over) was 53.5% (male: 58.2%, female: 49.6%).

See also
 Union Councils of Tangail District

References

Populated places in Tangail District
Unions of Mirzapur Upazila